Linda L. Richards is an author and journalist.

The founder and publisher of January Magazine and a contributing editor to the crime fiction blog The Rap Sheet, she is best known for her strong female protagonists in the thriller genre. Richards is from Vancouver, Canada and currently makes her home in Phoenix, Arizona. Her latest book, ENDINGS, was published by Oceanview Publishing in 2021. A PW starred review said that this “harrowing tale of love, loss, and the value of life is not to be missed.” A sequel, EXIT STRATEGY, will be published spring 2022.

Biography 
Linda L. Richards was born in Vancouver, British Columbia, Canada, and reared in Vancouver, Los Angeles, California, and Munich, Germany. She founded January Magazine in 1997 as an experiment in Web technologies in support of the computer books she was writing at that time.

In 2010 she was awarded The Panik Award (in honor of the late Paul Anik) for the best Los Angeles Noir for Death Was in the Picture.

In 2019 she was awarded The Arthur Ellis Award for best short story for "Terminal City" which appeared in Vancouver Noir.

Bibliography 

 Exit Strategy (2022) Oceanview Publishing
 Endings: A Novel (2021) Oceanview Publishing
 Return From Extinction: The Triumph of the Elephant Seal (2020) Orca Books
 Vancouver Noir (2018) Akashic Books (Contributor)
 When Blood Lies (2016) Orca Books/Rapid Reads
 Fast Women and Neon Lights (2016) Short Stack Books (Contributor)
 If It Bleeds (2014) Orca Books/Rapid Reads
 Death Was in the Blood (2013) Five Star/Cengage
 Thrillers: 101 Must Reads (2010) Oceanview Publishing (Contributor)
 Death Was in the Picture (2009) St. Martin's Minotaur/Thomas Dunne Books
 Death Was the Other Woman (2008) St. Martin's Minotaur/Thomas Dunne Books
 Calculated Loss (2006) MIRA Books
 The Next Ex (2005) MIRA Books
 Mad Money (2004) MIRA Books
 Web Graphics for Dummies (1997) MIS: Press
 Teach Yourself Photoshop (1997) Henry Holt
 The Canadian Business Guide to Using the Internet (1995) Self-Counsel Press

References

External links

Canadian women novelists
21st-century Canadian novelists
Canadian crime fiction writers
Canadian mystery writers
Writers from Vancouver
Canadian thriller writers
Year of birth missing (living people)
Living people
Women mystery writers
21st-century Canadian women writers
Women thriller writers